Francesco Schettino (born 14 November 1960) is an Italian former shipmaster who commanded the cruise ship Costa Concordia when it struck an underwater rock and capsized with the deaths of 32 passengers and crew off the Italian island of Giglio on 13 January 2012. In 2015, he was sentenced to sixteen years in prison for his role in the incident. He began serving his sentence in 2017 after exhausting his appeals.

Early life and education
Francesco Schettino was born in Castellammare di Stabia into a seafaring family based in Meta, Campania. He attended the nautical institute Nino Bixio in Piano di Sorrento, then worked for the ferry company Tirrenia.

Career
On 16 April 2002, aged 41, Schettino was hired by Costa Crociere, a subsidiary of Carnival Corporation. Starting as 1st deck Off. after two months he moved up to become Staff Captain on the role of second-in-command. In 2006, Schettino was promoted to Master receiving the honour to command the newly launched Costa Concordia. 

In 2010, as Master of the Costa Atlantica, he allegedly damaged another Carnival Corporation ship while entering the port of Warnemünde, Germany, at too high a speed. AIDA Cruises later denied that the incident caused damage. 

In 2014, two years after the Costa Concordia disaster, as invited by a university in Rome, he held a panic management seminar.

In 2015, Schettino published a book, Le verità sommerse, which portrayed himself as a hero. The book was controversially dedicated to the victims of the catastrophe. Many in the media criticized the book, especially how Schettino was attempting to profit off of the disaster, and to paint himself in a better light.

Costa Concordia disaster

Schettino was the captain in charge of the Costa Concordia on 13 January 2012, when the ship attempted a sail-by salute past Giglio, a manoeuvre he had performed before. The ship struck an underwater rock off the island, partially capsized and listed on its starboard side, resulting in the deaths of 32 people. Reportedly, Schettino was distracted by Moldovan dancer Domnica Cemortan, who was on the bridge at the time. Cemortan later admitted to being present on the bridge, and having an affair with Schettino.  However, Schettino himself claimed that he sailed so close to the rocks to perform a sail-by salute, and was navigating by sight since he knew the route so well.  Costa Cruises later said that Schettino failed to follow the approved route for drive-by salutes.  Schettino accepted some degree of responsibility and asked for forgiveness when he talked about those who had died. In 2012, Schettino's lawyer, Bruno Leporatti, defended his client's actions and indicated that his manoeuvre after the collision was "brilliant" and saved lives. In December 2014, another one of Schettino's lawyers, Domenico Pepe, just prior to Schettino's testimony, declared that his client wanted to set the record straight and "defend his honour".

Schettino indicated prior to trial that the underwater rocks that the ship hit were uncharted, the helmsman did not speak English or Italian, and that the ship's generators malfunctioned, impeding the rescue effort. Regarding his dry and early departure of the vessel, Schettino said he slipped off the ship when it turned over and fell into a lifeboat. A transcript of a recorded conversation between Schettino and Gregorio de Falco, the on-duty Italian Coast Guard commander, was broadcast across news bulletins. It details a very angry De Falco repeatedly ordering Schettino to leave the lifeboat and return to the stricken Costa Concordia. De Falco clearly does not believe Schettino's explanation of how he 'fell' into the lifeboat, or his excuse for not returning to his vessel because it was "too dark" and the lifeboat had "stopped moving". De Falco also proclaimed to Schettino, "You’ve abandoned ship! I’m in charge now,”  At one point, De Falco was so angered at Schettino's excuses that he told Schettino, "Vada a bordo, cazzo!" (most literally "Get back on board, you prick!" but also translated as "Get the fuck on board!", "Get on board, for fuck's sake!", or "Get on board, dammit!"), but Schettino did not do so and was one of the first to reach land.

Schettino also claimed he would have returned to the ship by helicopter, if it were possible. Carlo Galli, a Giglio police officer found Schettino, and offered to get him a dinghy to get him back to the ship, but Schettino declined. Galli also said that Schettino was dry, despite supposedly falling from the ship.

Treatment in media
Schettino was vilified in extensive media coverage that dubbed him "Captain Coward" and "Captain Calamity". Others in the press noted that Schettino was a daredevil and prone to insubordination. He was even described as "Italy's most hated man" by the tabloid press. At the end of his trial at Grosseto, Schettino said that he spent three years "in a media meat grinder."

Costa had communication with Schettino during the interval between the collision with the rock and the evacuation order; some claim this may have led to a delay in the rescue effort. However, Schettino did not contact his employers during the first 15 minutes after the collision. Thus, any such conversation(s) did not distract him from sending a mayday or ordering an evacuation. He reportedly lied to the coast guard to keep rescuers away, and ordered passengers away from "muster stations", delaying evacuation.

Schettino was initially believed to have been under the influence at the time of the event, but tested negative for drugs or alcohol the night of the disaster.

Legal proceedings
After the incident, Schettino was placed in temporary custody by the prosecutor of Grosseto and released for house arrest on 17 January 2012. On 5 July 2012, Schettino was released from house arrest but mandated to reside in Meta di Sorrento. Prior to Schettino's trial, Pier Luigi Foschi, at that time chairman of Costa, put blame on the captain as being responsible for deviating from the course and sailing close to Giglio. Costa terminated Schettino's employment in 2012. The company declined to pay for his legal defence although it had supported him initially, and after a plea bargain with the prosecution, it became a co-plaintiff in the trial against Schettino.

Schettino's trial was separated from a trial against five other Costa employees, namely Roberto Ferrarini (the company's crisis director, who was found guilty of minimizing the extent of the disaster and delaying an adequate response), cabin service director Manrico Giampedroni, first officer Ciro Ambrosio, helmsman Jacob Rusli Bin (an Indonesian and the only non-Italian indicted), and third officer Silvia Coronica. All pleaded guilty in a plea bargaining plan and received jail sentences ranging from eighteen months to two years and ten months. Reuters cited judicial sources as saying none of these individuals were likely to go to jail as sentences less than two years for non-violent offences are routinely suspended in Italy, and longer sentences may be appealed or replaced by community service. Criminal investigations into any role Costa may have had in the disaster were closed after the company agreed to pay a fine of €1 million. The company may still be liable for civil damages.

Court of Grosseto trial
On 23 February 2013, the office of the prosecution at Grosseto announced that it had initiated legal proceedings against Schettino. He was accused of multiple counts of manslaughter, causing a maritime accident, abandoning ship with passengers still on board, and lack of cooperation with rescue operations. The trial took place at Grosseto's "Teatro Moderno", which was adapted into a courtroom to handle lawyers of about 250 co-plaintiffs and about 400 scheduled witnesses.

While the other parties involved could plea bargain, Schettino's request to strike a plea bargain himself was denied. Schettino's lawyers claimed that he was being made a scapegoat, and that the helmsman and the Italian coast guard should take some of the blame.  By the time he had made his first appearance on 2 December 2014, he was left as the sole person to be accused of manslaughter. "Schettino is (now) the only defendant, but he is not the only one responsible", opined Daniele Bocciolini, lawyer for some survivors. "He's not responsible for the lifeboats that couldn't be launched nor for the (failing) emergency generators".

In his defense, Schettino explained that the sail-by salute was intended to pay homage to other mariners and, for business reasons, to present passengers a nice view. He denied that he did this to impress a Moldovan dancer whom he had brought to the bridge. She had boarded as a non-paying passenger and later admitted the two were having an affair. Schettino maintained that his actions had saved the lives of many after the ship hit the rock and claimed some of his crew misunderstood and botched his orders. Further, he blamed defective generators and the flooding of compartments for aggravating the situation. His lawyer argued that these malfunctions were responsible for the fatalities.

At the end of the proceeding, the public prosecutor Magistrate Maria Navarro asked for a jail sentence of 26 years and three months. Confirming the charges, she parsed jail times as follows: fourteen years for multiple manslaughter, nine years for causing a shipwreck, three years for abandoning the vessel and three months for failing to contact the authorities when the accident happened. Navarro accused Schettino of lying during the trial as well as in prior public interviews. Prosecutor Stefano Pizza stated, "The captain's duty to be the last person off the ship is not just an obligation dictated by ancient maritime rules, it is also a legal obligation intended to limit the damage to those on the ship." Schettino's lawyers rebutted the charges and indicated that the disaster was a collective failure for which he should not be made the scapegoat.

On 11 February 2015, after a 19-month trial, Judge Giovanni Puliatti read the verdict, sentencing Schettino to sixteen years in prison and five years of interdiction from navigating. The sixteen-year verdict is composed of ten years for manslaughter, five years for causing the shipwreck, and one year for abandoning his passengers, to be served consecutively.

Response to the verdict
Although Costa's lawyer called the verdict "balanced", others criticized it. Survivors' groups saw it as too lenient. On the other hand, it was also argued that Schettino, while guilty, had been made a scapegoat. According to this view, the disaster was a complex failure, involving not only negligence on part of the captain, but also inadequate safety procedures, poor evacuation procedures, communication failures, and technical defects (such as faulty watertight doors). On 31 May 2016, an Italian appeals court upheld Schettino's prison sentence. Schettino further appealed to Italy's Supreme Court of Cassation, which upheld the original sentence on 12 May 2017. On hearing the verdict of the second appeal, he turned himself in to Rome's Rebibbia prison to begin his sentence.

Personal life 
Present with him on the bridge during the collision was 26-year-old Moldovan dancer Domnica Cemortan, who has admitted she had been having an extramarital affair with Schettino. Before starting his prison sentence, Schettino lived in Meta in the Province of Naples. He is married to Fabiola Russo and has one daughter.

See also

The captain goes down with the ship
Yiannis Avranas

References

1960 births
Italian sailors
Costa Cruises
Living people
Italian people convicted of manslaughter
Prisoners and detainees of Italy
People from Campania